Kayima Sendikaddiwa was Kabaka (King) of the Kingdom of Buganda, between 1494 and 1524. He was the 7th Kabaka of Buganda.

Claim to the throne
He was the son of Prince (Omulangira) Wampamba, by his first wife, Lady Nakayima. He ascended the throne upon the death of his grandfather, Kiggala Mukaabya in 1494. He established his capital at Nazigo Hill.

Marital life

He had two wives:
Nababinge, daughter of Wampona, of the Mamba clan
Naddogo, daughter of Kasujja, of the Ngeye clan

Issue

He fathered two sons:
Kabaka Nakibinge Kagali, whose mother was Nababinge
Prince (Omulangira) Kabasanda, whose mother was Naddogo

The final years
He was killed in battle against Chief Bwakamba of Nyendo, at Sunga, in 1524. He is buried at Nabulagala, Busiro.

Succession table

See also
Kabaka of Buganda

References

External links
List of the Kings of Buganda

Kabakas of Buganda
15th-century monarchs in Africa
16th-century monarchs in Africa